Expo/Crenshaw station is a light rail station in the Los Angeles County Metro Rail system located in the Jefferson Park neighborhood of Los Angeles at the intersection of Crenshaw and Exposition Boulevards. During construction, it was known as the Crenshaw station. The station is the transfer point between the E Line, which stops at two street-level platforms alongside Exposition Boulevard, and the K Line, which has its northern terminus at a single island platform under Crenshaw Boulevard.

History 

Originally little more than a stop marker on the Los Angeles and Independence Railroad and Pacific Electric interurban line, passenger service ended on September 30, 1953, with closure of the Santa Monica Air Line. It remained out of service and the station was eventually dismantled. A new station in its place opened on Saturday, April 28, 2012.

E Line
The new station at Exposition and Crenshaw Blvd, opened on Saturday, April 28, 2012, completely rebuilt for the service on the Expo Line (E Line). It opened during the completion of Phase I of the E Line from 7th Street/Metro Center to Culver City. Regular scheduled service commenced Monday, April 30, 2012. The station has near-side platforms.

K Line 

Expo/Crenshaw became a transfer station when the K Line service began in late 2022. The Metro staff board ruled out an at-grade junction station between the K Line and E Line, stating that it was operationally not feasible. (Such a junction would result in three rail lines—the K, E, and the A Lines—sharing the single pair of tracks on Flower Street leading into 7th Street/Metro Center station, putting those tracks well above their capacity limit and causing delays.) Instead, a light rail subway station for the K Line was constructed under Crenshaw Boulevard between Exposition Boulevard and Obama Boulevard (formerly Rodeo Road) in order to allow for an extension of the K Line north through a D Line station and to the B Line's Hollywood/Highland station, where it will terminate via a route to be determined.

Metro held a ceremonial ribbon cutting ceremony for the station on July 8, 2022, attended by U.S. Secretary of Transportation Pete Buttigieg. The station opened on October 7, 2022.

Service

Station layout 
The E Line platforms are located in the median strip of Exposition Boulevard on either side of its intersection with the busy Crenshaw Boulevard, a major L.A. thoroughfare. This intersection is a short walk to either Obama Boulevard or Jefferson Blvd. The entrance to the K Line subway station is located at the southeast corner of Expo and Crenshaw; passengers must cross the street to transfer

The surface station has near-side platforms: this means that the platforms are positioned on opposite sides of the intersection, and trains always stop at the platform before crossing the intersection. Although it is now a transfer station to the K Line, no underground passageway been built from the E Line platforms to the K Line station mezzanine.

Hours and frequency

Connections 
, the following connections are available:
 LADOT DASH: Midtown

Parking 
The station does not have its own parking lot, but instead leases 225 stalls in a 500-stall parking structure owned by the West Angeles Church of God in Christ for use as a park and ride. As part of this arrangement, the garage is not open to Metro passengers on Sunday when the church holds services.

Notable places nearby 
The station is within walking distance of the following notable places:
 West Angeles Church of God in Christ
 Black Dahlia body site

Station artwork 
The station incorporates artwork by several artists.

The art panels on the E Line platforms were created by artist Willie Middlebrook; his untitled installation uses manipulated photographs to depict the diverse population in interaction with the earth and the environment. The colors used were inspired by the stained glass windows of the nearby West Angeles Church of God in Christ.

The K Line station entrance artwork is Inside Out – Outside In – Inside Out by Erwin Redl, a series of glazed glass panels with colored squares. By day these panels appear to project colors onto nearby surfaces and at night they make the station entrance appear as an illuminated jewel box. Like the earlier E Line art panels, the colors selected were inspired by the stained glass windows of the West Angeles Cathedral.

The mezzanine level features two mosaic murals called At the Same Time by artist Rebeca Méndez. One mural features vertical segments showing the progression of time over 24 hours in 15 minute increments, portraying stars, the moon, and cloudy skies. The other mural depicts a lofted bird wing, visible while descending the escalators to the platform to evoke a long-distance avian migration, with the wings also referencing the angels called upon during sermons at the West Angeles Cathedral.

The K Line platform has collages entitled Layered Histories by Jaime Scholnick. To create the piece, the artist used 11,800 photographs of the surrounding neighborhood to depict a colorful and abstracted street scenes, creating a time capsule reflective of the spirit of the surrounding community.

References 

E Line (Los Angeles Metro) stations
Railway stations in Los Angeles
K Line (Los Angeles Metro) stations
Jefferson Park, Los Angeles
Railway stations in the United States opened in 2012
2012 establishments in California
Pacific Electric stations